Eat Me! is a 2000 comedy film directed by Joe Talbott and starring Waleed Zuaiter, Ron Jeremy and Rhea Seehorn.

Plot
An eclectic group of bachelors share a house in Washington, D.C., and find that life past the Generation-X years doesn't get any easier. Gary is the den mother, who presides over director Mike, Sean the druggie and doctor Barrie. Together with Glynna they take on everyone from utility companies to drug dealers.

Cast
 Kris Arnold as Sean
 Jack Daniel as Gary
 Andy Rapoport	as Mike
 Waleed Zuaiter as Barry
 Rhea Seehorn as Glynna
 Christopher Walker as D.D.
 Ron Hyatt as Porno Jack
 Bill Delaney as Daryl 
 Claiborne Lashley as Puck
 Steve Carpenter as Loan Officer
 Kimberly Skyrme as Susan
 Jimmy Gallagher as Banker
 Chris Lane as Porno Actor 
 Jon Sherman as Annoying Guy
 Shari Lewis as Tidy Girl
 Turdy Anus as MP
 Anthony Agnew as Police Officer
 Ian LeValley as Dave
 Kerri Rambow

Release
The film was screened at the American Paviliaon of the Cannes Film Festival and in sidebar screenings in Park City at the Sundance Film Festival.

Awards
 Washington Film and Video Council - Best Original Screenplay

Soundtrack
The soundtrack included music by the bands Kingface, Peter Hayes Condition, Citizen Cope and many others.

  
 Peter Hayes Condition - "Am On"
 Lu Bango - "Any Day"
 Citizen Cope - "Daughters Of The Stage"
 Peter Hayes Condition - "Get A Little Closer"
 Adam West - "Haunted"
 Con - "Heaven 1999"
 Sampson - "House Of Ruth"
 Kingface - "I Believe"
 Johnny Nash - "I Can See Clearly"

 The Space Cossacks - "Journey To The Stars"
 Dana Cerick - "Last Match"
 Kingface - "Learn To Love The Leash"
 Cosmos Factor - "Maya"
 Sam Spencer - "Our Time In The World"
 Sam Spencer - "Pass Down"
 Mike Shupp - "River To The Sea"
 Citizen Cope - "Shotguns"

 Adam West - "Speedbump"
 Boomslang - "Suitcase"
 James Brown - "Superbad, Pts. 1 & 2"
 Sam Spencer - "Tell Me"
 Coppershop - "That Was Me Yesterday"
 Tuscadero - "The Game Song"
 Eric Brace and Last Train Home - "True North"

References

External links
 

American comedy films
2000 comedy films
2000 films
2000s English-language films
2000s American films